is the sequel to the TV drama Ring: The Final Chapter, based on the novel Spiral by Koji Suzuki. Much like Ring: The Final Chapter, it does not adapt much of the original source material. There are a total of 13 episodes in the series.

List of episodes
"Sadako's Revenge: A Horror Greater Than The Ring"
"The Dead Watch the Well"
"I Come to Kill Myself..."
"A Dead Person is Resurrected to a Legendary Village"
"The Devil Was in This Room"
"Nobody Can Stop Me Any Longer"
"The Man Who Made Sadako"
"The Child Who Died Twice..."
"The Ring of Hatred is Complete"
"The Prisoner is Murdered by a Prison Guard"
"The Fortuneteller is Murdered"
"The World Will Fall to Ruins Tomorrow"
"The Immortal"

References

External links
 

1999 Japanese television series debuts
1999 Japanese television series endings
The Ring (franchise)
Japanese drama television series
Fuji TV dramas
Mystery television series
Sequel television series
Television shows based on Japanese novels
Japanese supernatural television series
Japanese horror fiction television series